Tony Lit MBE  is a British-Indian politician and Managing Director of Sunrise Radio. He was appointed MBE in the 2019 New Year Honours for services to the British-Asian community.

Lit has worked in radio, TV and events. Based at Sunrise Radio Hounslow office he works with Chairman Gurdev Jassi, building on Sunrise Radio's recent success, overseeing strategy and revenue growth.

Lit joined Sunrise Radio from Sony Entertainment TV Asia where he was Vice President Business Head UK & Europe Sony Entertainment Network three Channels. During his time at Sony, Lit was instrumental in the last few years of business success at the network, across sales & channel distribution and expansion of the network of channels distributed via Talk Talk & Virgin in the UK and across many other platforms in Europe.

The inaugural British Asian Media (BAM) Awards saw the media fraternity come together to celebrate and felicitate diversity and campaigns which empower the South Asian media industry. The Media Impact of the Year Award was conferred upon  Lit for his contribution to the British Asian media industry in January 2019.

Lit and British Prime Minister Boris Johnson attended Milton Keynes Gurdwara ahead of Diwali and to celebrate the auspicious 550th Birth Anniversary of Sri Guru Nanak Dev Ji.

Lit addressed at the Drive to Digital 2019 Conference held on 30 October at The British Library Knowledge Centre, giving them a background of Sunrise Radio from launch in 1989 to present day and how digital innovation had allowed him to grow and develop Sunrise Radio nationally.  

Lit was officially unveiled as a new Ambassador for CRY on 21 January 2020. Tony first approached CRY following the sudden death of the only son of a family friend from a previously undiagnosed heart condition. He was aged just 17 and was a fit and sporty young man, with his death sending shockwaves throughout his local community and beyond.  As a father of 3, Tony was deeply moved by this tragedy and pledged, “whatever support Sunrise Radio and I can give personally, over and above, I shall do so.”

Personal life
Lit is the son of businessman Avtar Lit, and is a British-Indian Sikh. He and his wife Mandy have three children and live in Ham within Richmond, South-West London.

Political career
Lit was the Conservative Party candidate in the 2007 Ealing Southall by-election, following in the footsteps of his father, who had stood for the seat as an Independent in 2001. Lit Jr. finished third of twelve candidates, with 22.5% of the vote.

References

Living people
British people of South Asian descent
British people of Indian descent
British people of Punjabi descent
British Sikhs
English people of South Asian descent
English people of Indian descent
English people of Punjabi descent
English Sikhs
Category:British politicians of South Asian descent
British politicians of Indian descent
British politicians of Punjabi descent
Conservative Party (UK) parliamentary candidates
Members of the Order of the British Empire
Year of birth missing (living people)
Ham, London